Lost at Home is an American sitcom that aired on ABC from April 1 to April 22, 2003. The show starred Mitch Rouse, Connie Britton, Gregory Hines (in his final television role), Stark Sands, Leah Pipes, Gavin Fink and Aaron Hill. The show was cancelled after only four episodes.

Cast
Mitch Rouse as Michael Davis
Connie Britton as Rachel Davis, Michael's wife
Stark Sands as Will Davis, Michael & Rachel's son
Leah Pipes as Sarah Davis, Michael & Rachel's daughter
Gavin Fink as Josh Davis, Michael & Rachel's son
Aaron Hill as Tucker
Gregory Hines as Jordan King

Episodes

S01E09 - State of the Union (written, but not produced)

References

External links
 

2000s American sitcoms
2003 American television series debuts
2003 American television series endings
English-language television shows
American Broadcasting Company original programming
Television series created by Michael Jacobs
Television series by Universal Television
Television series by ABC Studios